Gruchet-Saint-Siméon is a commune in the Seine-Maritime department in the Normandy region in northern France.

Heraldry

Geography

Population

Places of interest
 The church of St.Siméon, dating from the fifteenth century.
 A fifteenth century farmhouse.
 A protestant church.

See also
Communes of the Seine-Maritime department

References

Communes of Seine-Maritime